Rodrigo Antônio do Nascimento (born 27 July 1987) is a Brazilian footballer who plays as a midfielder for Berço.

Career
Born in Rio de Janeiro, Antônio is a youth prospect of CR Vasco da Gama, debuting for the club in 2006 in the top tier. On 29 December 2008, he made his first moved abroad, joining Marítimo in the Portuguese league. He debuted on 1 February 2009, in an away win against Associação Naval 1º de Maio.

After two seasons, which included a passage for their reserve team, Antônio returned to Brazil and signed a loan deal with Ipatinga on 28 July 2010. The following year, he moved to Belenenses on the same predicament.

On 1 July 2013, Antônio joined Paços de Ferreira, adding eleven caps in his first year, and spending his second year, loaned to Olhanense, with Ricardo Ferreira going in the opposite direction, also in a loan deal.

On 9 February 2017, Antônio signed for Irtysh Pavlodar of the Kazakhstan Premier League. After leaving Irtysh Pavlodar at the end of the 2017 season, Antônio re-signed for Irtysh Pavlodar on 24 July 2018.

References

External links

1987 births
Living people
Footballers from Rio de Janeiro (city)
Brazilian footballers
Association football midfielders
CR Vasco da Gama players
C.S. Marítimo players
Ipatinga Futebol Clube players
C.F. Os Belenenses players
F.C. Paços de Ferreira players
S.C. Olhanense players
Bnei Sakhnin F.C. players
FC Irtysh Pavlodar players
S.C. Covilhã players
Berço SC players
Primeira Liga players
Liga Portugal 2 players
Israeli Premier League players
Brazilian expatriate footballers
Expatriate footballers in Portugal
Expatriate footballers in Israel
Expatriate footballers in Kazakhstan
Brazilian expatriate sportspeople in Portugal
Brazilian expatriate sportspeople in Israel
Brazilian expatriate sportspeople in Kazakhstan